WCMS-FM (94.5 FM) is a radio station broadcasting a New Country format. Licensed to Hatteras, North Carolina, United States, the station serves the Elizabeth City-Nags Head area. WCMS has used the name "Water Country" since it signed on in 1999. The original call letters were WWOC. The change to the WCMS call letters was granted on 7/28/2005. The station was owned by Max Media until 2018 after a sale from Ray-D-O Biz LLC.

The station is affiliated with the Motor Racing Network and the Performance Racing Network and carries live broadcasts of NASCAR Cup Series, NASCAR Xfinity Series, and NASCAR Camping World Truck Series races.

References

External links
WCMS Website

CMS
Radio stations established in 1999
Max Media radio stations
1999 establishments in North Carolina
Country radio stations in the United States